The following is a list of events affecting Philippine television in 1996. Events listed include television show debuts, finales, cancellations, and channel launches, closures and rebrandings, as well as information about controversies and carriage disputes.

Events
 March 11 - RPN debuts the series premiere of MariMar, which would begin an era of Latino drama broadcasts in Philippine television.
 May 1 - The ABS-CBN News Channel (ANC) was officially launched as the Sarimanok News Network (SNN).
 May 6 - Pinoy Box Office was officially launched as the Viva Cinema.
 October 12 - Studio 23 (now S+A) was officially launched, until its closure on January 16, 2014.

Premieres

Unknown
 Cyber Jam on SBN 21
 SBN Live on SBN 21
 SBN Karaoke on SBN 21
 Lihim ng Gabi on GMA 7
 Bilibitornot on GMA 7
 PG (Parents Guide) on GMA 7
 Special Engagement on GMA 7
 1896 Kalayaan on GMA 7
 Earthlink on ABS-CBN 2
 Powerline on ABS-CBN 2
 Guni Guni on ABC 5
 Home Sweet Haus on ABC 5
 Que Horror on ABC 5
 Chinese Variety Show on ABC 5
 O-gag on ABC 5
 Dial M on PTV 4
 Dighay Bayan on PTV 4
 Muay Thai on PTV 4
 Better Home Ideas on RPN 9
 Veggie, Meaty & Me on RPN 9
 Nap Knock on RPN 9
 Let's Dance with Becky Garcia  on RPN 9
 Good Morning Misis! on RPN 9
 Star Search sa 9 on RPN 9
 Back To Back on RPN 9
 Life In The Word on RPN 9
 Nap Knock on RPN 9
 Isumbong Mo Kay Tulfo on RPN 9
 The Quantum Channel on RPN 9
 Jiban on IBC 13
 Winspector on IBC 13
 PSE Live: The Stock Market Today on IBC 13
 Usisera-Intrigera on IBC 13
 Mag Smile Club Na! on IBC 13
 Sky Ranger Gavan on IBC 13
 Ilusiones on ABS-CBN 2
 Lazos de Amor on ABS-CBN 2
 Pollyanna on ABS-CBN 2
 Magic Knight Rayearth on ABS-CBN 2
 Little Women on ABS-CBN 2
 Si Mary at Ang Lihim na Hardin on ABS-CBN 2
 Neon Genesis Evangelion on ABC 5
 Eto Rangers on ABC 5
 Battle Ball on IBC 13
 Dragon Quest on IBC 13
 Ranma ½ on RPN 9

Programs transferring networks

Finales
 February 27:
 Inside Showbiz on GMA 7
 Batang X sa TV on ABC 5
 March 31: Mel & Jay on ABS-CBN 2
 May 3: That's Entertainment on GMA 7
 May 31:
 Asia Business News on ABS-CBN 2
 Magandang Umaga Po on ABS-CBN 2
 June 1: Star Circle Quest: Season 1 on ABS-CBN 2
 June 8: Game Na Game Na! on ABS-CBN 2
 August 2: Mother Studio Presents on GMA 7
 August 9:
 Kris on PTV 4
 Kadenang Kristal on GMA 7
 Eye to Eye on GMA 7
 September 1: Lovingly Yours on GMA 7
 September 29: Familia Zaragoza on ABS-CBN 2
 October 25: Kris on GMA 7
 November 8: D.A.T.S. on GMA 7

Unknown date
 February: Blow by Blow on PTV 4

Unknown
 Liberty on TV on GMA 7
 Profiles Of Power on GMA 7
 Sounds Family on GMA 7
 FPJ sa GMA on GMA 7
 1896 Kalayaan on GMA 7
 World TV Mag on World TV 21
 Lente on ABC 5
 Small Wonder on ABC 5
 Action Theater on ABC 5
 Better Home Ideas on ABC 5
 Kada on ABC 5
 P.O.P.S.: Pops On Primetime Saturday on ABC 5
 1896 on ABC 5
 Guni Guni on ABC 5
 Home Sweet Haus on ABC 5
 Hope Top of the Hour News on ABC 5
 Isang Tanong, Isang Sagot! on ABC 5
 Nora Aunor Sunday Drama Special on ABC 5
 Movie Greats on ABS-CBN 2
 Carol En Cosme on ABS-CBN 2
 Bayan Ko, Sagot Ko on ABS-CBN 2
 Movie Greats on ABS-CBN 2
 Konsumer Korner on IBC 13
 P.Y. (Praise Youth) on IBC 13
 T.A.H.O (Tawanan at Awitan kay Hesus Oras-oras) on IBC 13
 Usisera-Intrigera on IBC 13
 PPP: Piling Piling Pelikula on IBC 13
 Lumayo Ka Man on RPN 9
 Chibugan Na! on RPN 9
 Actually, Yun Na! on RPN 9
 Back To Back on RPN 9
 Star Smile Factory on RPN 9
 Veggie, Meaty & Me on RPN 9
 Race Weekend on PTV 4
 Pollyanna on ABS-CBN 2
 Little Women on ABS-CBN 2
 Si Mary at Ang Lihim na Hardin on ABS-CBN 2
 Eto Rangers on ABC 5

Networks

Launches
 May 6: Viva Cinema
 July 10: Sarimanok News Network
 September 1: Disney Channel (Southeast Asia)
 October 12: Studio 23

Births
January 3 - Baninay Bautista
 January 4 - Joshua Colet, actor and model
January 6 - Elisse Joson, actress, model and endorser
January 15 - Julian Estrada, actor
January 22 – Khalil Ramos, actor and singer
February 3 – Rhap Salazar, singer, songwriter and actor
March 26 – Kathryn Bernardo, actress and singer
March 29 – Erin Ocampo, TV Host, singer, dancer and actress
April 3 - Jonathan Celestino, actor, dancer and TV host
April 12 - Charlie Dizon, actress and dancer
April 22 - Angelica Mauricio, actress and model
April 29 – Rebecca Chiongbian, actress
May 10 - Anjo Damiles, actor
May 21 – Jay Arcilla, actor
May 27 - Rico dela Paz, actor
June 2 - Morissette, singer, songwriter, and actress
June 9 - Marvelous Alejo, actress and singer
July 20 - Sue Ramirez, actress
July 22 – Jane Oineza, actress
July 23 – Viy Cortez, vlogger
August 3 – 
 Kristoffer Horace Neudeck, actor and model
 Anikka Dela Cruz
August 9 – Sanya Lopez, actress
August 13 - Thea Tolentino, actress
August 15 - Chienna Filomeno, actress, dancer and TV Host
August 17 – Ella Cruz, actress
August 24 – Faye Lorenzo
August 31 – Eugene Herrera, actor and swimmer
September 8 – Krystal Reyes, actress
September 13 – CJ Navato, actor
September 21 – Cecille Escolano, actress, dancer and TV Host
September 27 – Remedy Rule, swimmer
October 9 - Vincent Manlapaz, actor, dancer and TV Host
October 17 – Karen Reyes, actress
October 26 – Ronnie Alonte, actor and singer
November 4 – Michael Christian Martinez, figure skater
November 7 – Luke Gebbie, swimmer
November 14 – Rabiya Mateo
November 28 – 
 Claire Bercero, actress and dancer
 Tom Doromal, actor, dancer and TV Host  
December 7 – Kamille Filoteo, dancer, singer and TV Host
December 11 – Kelly Day, actress, model, singer, dancer, TV Host
December 22 - 
Joao Constancia, actor, dancer and singer
Makisig Morales, actor and singer
December 25 - Ivana Alawi, actress

Deaths
June 2 - Ishmael Bernal, Filipino film, stage and television director, actor and 
November 27 - Balot, comedian, film, television and stage actor

See also
1996 in television

References

 
Television in the Philippines by year
Philippine television-related lists